This is a list of schools in Eastern District, Hong Kong.

Secondary schools

 Government
 Belilios Public School
 Clementi Secondary School
 Shau Kei Wan East Government Secondary School 
 Shau Kei Wan Government Secondary School

 Aided
 Canossa College
  (明愛柴灣馬登基金中學)
  (中華基督教會桂華山中學)
 Cheung Chuk Shan College
  (張振興伉儷書院)
  (中華傳道會劉永生中學)
  (文理書院（香港）)
 Fortress Hill Methodist Secondary School
  (福建中學（小西灣）)
 Henrietta Secondary School
 Hong Kong Chinese Women's Club College
 Islamic Kasim Tuet Memorial College
  (嶺南衡怡紀念中學)
 Lingnan Secondary School
  (閩僑中學)
  (衞理中學)
 Munsang College (Hong Kong Island)
 Precious Blood Secondary School
 Salesian English School
  (聖公會李福慶中學)
 St Joan of Arc Secondary School
 St Mark's School

 Direct Subsidy Scheme
  (漢華中學)
 Kiangsu-Chekiang College, International Section
 Pui Kiu Middle School
 The Chinese Foundation Secondary School

 Private
 Carmel School 
 Chinese International School
 DSC International School (德思齊加拿大國際學校)
 Grace Christian Academy (培生學校)
 Invictus Secondary School
 Korean International School of Hong Kong

Primary schools

 Government
 Aldrich Bay Government Primary School (愛秩序灣官立小學)
 North Point Government Primary School (北角官立小學)
 Shau Kei Wan Government Primary School (筲箕灣官立小學)

 Aided
 Buddhist Chung Wah Kornhill Primary School (佛教中華康山學校)
 Canossa School (Hong Kong) (香港嘉諾撒學校
 CCC Kei Wan Primary School (中華基督教會基灣小學)
 CCC Kei Wan Primary School (Aldrich Bay) (中華基督教會基灣小學（愛蝶灣）)
 Chan's Creative School (Hong Kong Island) (啓基學校（港島）)
 Chinese Methodist School (North Point) (北角循道學校)
 Chinese Methodist School, Tanner Hill (丹拿山循道學校)
 ELCHK Faith Love Lutheran School (基督教香港信義會信愛學校)
 The Endeavourers Leung Lee Sau Yu Memorial Primary School (勵志會梁李秀娛紀念小學)
  (香港中國婦女會丘佐榮學校)
 Meng Tak Catholic School (天主教明德學校)
 North Point Methodist Primary School (北角衞理小學)
 Pui Kiu Primary School (培僑小學)
 Pun U Association Wah Yan Primary School (番禺會所華仁小學)
 S.K.H. Chai Wan St Michael's Primary School (聖公會柴灣聖米迦勒小學)
 Sa Ann Wyllie Memorial School (救世軍韋理夫人紀念學校)
 Salesian School (慈幼學校)
 Salvation Army Centaline Charity Fund School (救世軍中原慈善基金學校)
 Shanghai Alumni Primary School (滬江小學)
 Shaukiwan Tsung Tsin School (筲箕灣崇真學校)
 SKH St Michael's Primary School (聖公會聖米迦勒小學)
 Taikoo Primary School (太古小學)

 English Schools Foundation
 Quarry Bay School

 Private
 Carmel School
 Chinese International School
 DSC International School
 French International School of Hong Kong Chai Wan Campus
 Grace Christian Academy
 Kiangsu & Chekiang Primary School (蘇浙小學校)
 Korean International School of Hong Kong

Special schools
 Aided
 Caritas Lok Yi School (明愛樂義學校)
 Hong Kong Red Cross Hospital Schools Pamela Youde Nethersole Eastern Hospital (香港紅十字會醫院學校)
 PLK Yu Lee Mo Fan Memorial School (保良局余李慕芬紀念學校)
 RCHK Island West Hong Chi Morninghope School (香港西區扶輪社匡智晨輝學校)

Former schools
 Government
 Java Road Government Primary School
 Private
 Hong Kong Japanese School Secondary Section  In April 2018 the junior high school moved to the Happy Valley campus.

References

Lists of schools in Hong Kong
Eastern District, Hong Kong